Natallia Marchanka (born 19 May 1979) is a Belarusian basketball player who competed in the 2008 Summer Olympics.

References

1979 births
Living people
Belarusian women's basketball players
Olympic basketball players of Belarus
Basketball players at the 2008 Summer Olympics